Phocides polybius, the bloody spot or guava skipper, is a species of butterfly in the skipper family, Hesperiidae, that is native to the Americas. It is found from the lower Rio Grande Valley of southern Texas in the United States south through Mexico and Central America to Argentina. The species was first described by Johan Christian Fabricius in 1793.

There are several generations with adults on wing in February, April, and June to December in southern Texas.

The larvae feed on Psidium species, including Psidium guajava and Psidium cattleianum. Adults probably feed on flower nectar.

Subspecies
Phocides polybius polybius (Suriname, Guyana)
Phocides polybius lilea (Lower Rio Grande Valley of Texas, Mexico to Colombia, Brazil)
Phocides polybius phanias (Argentina, Brazil)

References

External links

NABA South Texas
Phocides polybius attracted by Eugenia uniflora in Argentina

Eudaminae
Butterflies described in 1793
Butterflies of North America
Hesperiidae of South America
Insects of Central America
Fauna of the Rio Grande valleys